Liotella rotula is a species of minute sea snail, a marine gastropod mollusc in the family Skeneidae.

Description
The height of the shell attains 1 mm, its diameter 1.7 mm. This thin, white, translucent shell has a discoidal shape and is widely umbilicate. The flat spire consists of  4 whorls, including the 2 narrow, smooth, convex whorls of the slightly raised protoconch. The shell is ornamented with many radial riblets and intercostal spiral striae. The rounded, elevated spiral riblets are prominent. These are much closer together on approaching the aperture. The Interstices are distantly microscopically spirally striate. The large, convex body whorl  contains 17 radial riblets. It is rounded at the periphery, but convex at the base. The sutures are impressed. The aperture is rounded. The thin peristome is continuous,
thickened by the last radiate rib. The columella is arcuate, not reflexed. The umbilicus is wide. Its perspective shows all the whorls.

Distribution
This marine species is endemic to New Zealand.

References

 Powell A. W. B., New Zealand Mollusca, William Collins Publishers Ltd, Auckland, New Zealand 1979 
 Spencer, H.G.; Marshall, B.A.; Maxwell, P.A.; Grant-Mackie, J.A.; Stilwell, J.D.; Willan, R.C.; Campbell, H.J.; Crampton, J.S.; Henderson, R.A.; Bradshaw, M.A.; Waterhouse, J.B.; Pojeta, J. Jr (2009). Phylum Mollusca: chitons, clams, tusk shells, snails, squids, and kin, in: Gordon, D.P. (Ed.) (2009). New Zealand inventory of biodiversity: 1. Kingdom Animalia: Radiata, Lophotrochozoa, Deuterostomia. pp. 161–254
 The New Zealand Mollusca: Liotella rotula

rotula
Gastropods of New Zealand
Gastropods described in 1908